Awaday is a town located in the East Hararghe Zone of the Oromia, Ethiopia. Awaday is the world's biggest market and exporter of the amphetamine-like leaf khat, a stimulant known as Jimaa locally. Khat is the main cash crop traded 24 hours a day in the town. People used khat to increase awareness and lower fatigue while yielding euphoria. 

Awaday is an international hub for khat, from where it is exported to Somalia, Djibouti and the Arabian Peninsula, London, Amsterdam every night. Khat was Ethiopia's fourth largest export, yielding in more than 200 million euros 2013.

References

External links

Populated places in the Oromia Region